The 2018 Kilkenny Senior Hurling Championship was the 124th staging of the Kilkenny Senior Hurling Championship since its establishment by the Kilkenny County Board in 1887. The championship began on 22 September 2018 and ended on 28 October 2018.

Dicksboro were the defending champions, however, they were defeated by Ballyhale Shamrocks at the quarter-final stage.

On 28 October 2018, Ballyhale Shamrocks won the championship after a 2–20 to 2–17 defeat of Bennettsbridge at Nowlan Park. It was their 16th championship title overall and their first title since 2014.

Team changes

To Championship

Promoted from the Kilkenny Intermediate Hurling Championship
 St. Patrick's

From Championship

Relegated to the Kilkenny Intermediate Hurling Championship
 St. Martin's

Results

First round

Relegation play-off

Quarter-finals

Semi-finals

Final

Championship statistics

Top scorers

Top scorers overall

Top scorers in a single game

Miscellaneous

 Bennettsbridge qualified for the final for the first time since 1974.

References

External links
 2018 Kilkenny Senior Hurling Championship fixtures and results

Kilkenny Senior Hurling Championship
Kilkenny Senior Hurling Championship